The Murca Formation (Kim) is a geological formation of the Altiplano Cundiboyacense, Eastern Ranges of the Colombian Andes.

Etymology 
The formation was defined and named in 1990 by Moreno after the Murca River, Cundinamarca.

Description

Lithologies 
The basal part of the black and grey feldspar bearing sandstone beds contains large pyrite crystals. The matrix is formed by cements of calcite, iron oxide, sericite and chlorite.

Fossils of Berriasella colombiana and Pseudoosterella ubalaensis have been found in the Murca Formation.

Stratigraphy and depositional environment 
The Murca Formation, belonging to the Cáqueza Group, underlies the Trincheras Formation, lowermost unit of the Villeta Group. The contact with the underlying unit has not been observed. The age has been estimated to be Valanginian. Stratigraphically, the formation is time equivalent with the Cumbre, Rosablanca and Útica Formations. The formation has been deposited in a marine environment characterised by turbidites. A mid submarine fan and outer fan setting have been observed in the Murca Formation. A possible source for the sandstones were Precambrian sandstones, gneisses and granites, belonging to the Guiana Shield.

Outcrops 

The Murca Formation is apart from its type locality, found near Nimaima and Guayabal in the western flank and Ubalá and Labranzagrande in the eastern flank of the Eastern Ranges.

Regional correlations

See also 

 Geology of the Eastern Hills
 Geology of the Ocetá Páramo
 Geology of the Altiplano Cundiboyacense

References

Bibliography

Maps

External links 
 

Geologic formations of Colombia
Cretaceous Colombia
Lower Cretaceous Series of South America
Valanginian Stage
Sandstone formations
Shale formations
Open marine deposits
Turbidite deposits
Formations
Geography of Cundinamarca Department
Geography of Boyacá Department